Bitti Mohanty, also called Bitihotra Mohanty is a computer engineer and is a high-profile convict sentenced to seven years' imprisonment for raping a German tourist at Alwar, India and was since absconding after he was released on parole on 20 November 2006 to meet his ailing mother at Cuttack, Orissa. He was arrested from Kannur in Kerala, on Saturday, 9 March 2013. His case was one of the quickest rape trials conducted by a fast-track court; the trial was completed within 15 days of lodging the complaint. The parole was granted within 8 months of his conviction. His father, Bidya Bhushan Mohanty (B.B. Mohanty), an Indian Police Service officer, stood as surety for his son's 15 days' parole and was subsequently suspended and arrested on the charges of helping, hiding and harbouring his son. He was later reinstated into service in 2009 and retired in 2012. Six years after his son's disappearance, the father expressed ignorance about his son's whereabouts and asserted that his son did not commit any major crime.
 
A.S. Gill (the Director General of Police of Rajasthan) and B.B. Mohanty were batch mates and it was alleged that the investigation was slowed down due to intervention of high-ranking officials. The investigating parole officer was transferred abruptly on 29 May 2007 and this hampered a speedy investigation.

Father
Bitty Mohanty's father, an Indian Police Service officer had petitioned the National Human Rights Commission and the Rajasthan State Human Rights Commission, stating his son needed urgent medical treatment and should not be arrested. He established he found out about his son's ill health through communication with other inmates. The convict's father also argued that the German lady and his son were intimate and had been living together. Bitti is the eldest of two children of Mr and Mrs Mohanty.

Disappearance
He was charged with raping of a German national on 21 March 2006. The German lady and Bitti Mohanty were on a holiday in Rajasthan and took a hotel room at Alwar on 20 March 2006. He was convicted on 12 April 2006 by a fast-track court and police from Odisha and Rajasthan have failed to locate him thence.
	
Chief Minister of Rajasthan assured that police are trying to trace Bitty Mohanty by forming special teams, as he is considered a high-profile convict. However, after seven years of the convict's disappearance, the Rajasthani government stated that it had done all that was possible to arrest Bitty Mohanty.

Arrest

Bitty Mohanty was arrested from Kannur in Kerala, 9 March 2013. Police got information of Bitti by anonymous letter  received by the bank branch authorities where he was working as Raghav Rajan from Andhra Pradesh, suspecting that the man may be Bitti. His photo was shown among the pictures of accused sex crimes  running on television and Internet, which helped to identify him. He was working in a Bank with identity as Raghav Rajan.

References

Violence against women in India
Indian rapists
Crime in Rajasthan